Liveops is a contact center company based in Scottsdale, Arizona. It was formed by the merger of Silicon Valley startup CallCast, founded in 2001 by Wendell Brown and Bill Trenchard, and competing startup Liveops, founded in 2000 by Steve Doumar and Doug Feirstein in Fort Lauderdale, Florida.

In 2015, the company moved its headquarters to Scottsdale. Liveops provides U.S.-based agent services for insurance, health and human services, and retail customers.

Liveops was one of the first "gig economy" companies and the work-at-home virtual workforce industry, and it has been featured at an INSEAD Case Study at Harvard Business Review. As of 2016, Liveops employed a large work-at-home workforce with over 25,000 temporary, work-at-home employees, and its cloud platform had processed more than one billion minutes of customer service interactions.

History

In 2003, Florida-based Liveops merged with California-based CallCast, renaming CallCast as Liveops, and moving its headquarters to Redwood City, California in 2004.

In 2006, Liveops named former eBay COO Maynard Webb as its CEO.

In 2011, Liveops named former Sybase president Marty Beard as its new CEO.

In 2014, BlackBerry poached Marty Beard as their new COO and Liveops named former ShoreTel VP Vasili Triant as its new CEO.

In July 2015, Liveops relocated their headquarters from Redwood City, California to Cedar Park, Texas.

In October 2015, Liveops opens new Agent Services headquarters in Scottsdale, AZ.

In December 2015, Liveops announced that Marlin Equity Partners would acquire the Liveops Cloud Platform business.

In December 2016, Keith Leimbach was named CEO.

In September 2017, Liveops named former COO, Greg Hanover, CEO.

Funding

Liveops is a venture backed startup that has received over $50 million in venture capital funding.

CallCast (which merged with Liveops) raised a $1 million Series A funding round in January 2002 with funding from Scott Banister, Wendell Brown, Reid Hoffman, Josh Kopelman, and Bill Trenchard.

Liveops raised a $22 million Series B round on April 1, 2004 led by Menlo Ventures and CMEA Capital.

On February 13, 2007 the company raised a $28 million Series C round from Menlo Ventures, CMEA Capital, Benchmark, and Michael Dearing.

References

External links
 

Online companies of the United States
Companies established in 2000
Companies based in Redwood City, California
Multinational companies headquartered in the United States
Privately held companies of the United States